The Вattalion for Special Operations "Hawks", is a battalion within the 72nd Brigade for Special Operations of the Serbian Armed Forces. Formed in 1992 as a military police battalion for counter-terrorist operations within the newly formed 72nd Special Brigade, became counter-terrorist battalion "Hawks" in 2006 within the Special Brigade and with re-establishment of 72nd Brigade for Special Operations it was renamed to battalion for the special operations "Hawks" with broader range of tasks (not just counter-terrorism). Its main task is counter-terrorism.  The symbol of the unit is the falcon.

See also
72nd Brigade for Special Operations
Battalion "Griffins"

External links

Special Brigade

Counter-terrorist Battalion of MP Serbian Special Brigade
Battalions of Serbia
Military units and formations established in 1992
Special forces
Counterterrorist organizations